The Frankfurt-Höchst station is an important station in the Frankfurt district of Höchst and is the second largest station in the city with twelve tracks. It is currently mainly used by S-Bahn, suburban and regional services. It is the most important public transport node in western Frankfurt.

History 

The first Höchst station was built as part of one of the oldest railways in Germany. On 26 September 1839, four years after the opening of Germany's first railway from Nuremberg to Fürth, the first section of the Taunus Railway opened from the Taunus station in Frankfurt, running nine kilometres west to Höchst. The first Höchst station was not at the current location, but 400 metres east of it at Königsteiner Straße.

At the time the line was an international route, connecting the Free City of Frankfurt and the Duchy of Nassau. On 19 May 1840, the line was completed via Hattersheim, Flörsheim and Mainz-Kastel (then in the Grand Duchy of Hesse) to Wiesbaden, the capital of Nassau. The entire route from the current S-Bahn station of Taunusanlage to Wiesbaden is now part of the busy S-Bahn S1 line.

A second line was connected to Höchst in 1847 with the opening of the short Soden Railway—Germany's oldest branch line. It linked the major spa of Bad Soden with the rest of the world. In 1877 this was followed by the much more important Limburg Railway, which provided a connection between Frankfurt and the Lahn Valley Railway (running between Gießen and Koblenz) across Nassau, which had been annexed by Prussia as a result of the 1866 War.

In 1880, the old station building of 1839 was replaced by a new building. It was designed by the royal inspector of railways and industry, Heinrich Velde, who designed a total of 37 stations in the Rhine-Main area, of which Höchst station is considered his architectural tour de force. The new building was built on an “island” between the tracks of the Limburg line to the south and the Taunus and Sodene lines to the north, west of Königsteiner Straße.

In 1902, the Königstein Railway was opened via Kelkheim to Königstein, so that with the opening in the meantime of a second line to Frankfurt (the extension of the Limburg Railway to Frankfurt Hauptbahnhof in 1888), there were now six lines connecting to Höchst station, three from east and three from the west. On 1 September 1905, the Bäder curve was opened from Rödelheim on the Homburg line. The Bäder curve was initially used only by freight trains; passenger services began in 1908, including a Berlin–Wiesbaden express via Bad Nauheim and Bad Homburg.

The current Höchst station building was opened in 1914.

Current station 
Höchst station would be sufficient, with its twelve platform tracks, for a city. In fact, only eight tracks are used regularly, one platform is closed completely. The entrance hall, the design of which is influenced by Art Nouveau is run-down.

Services

  Frankfurt Hbf – Frankfurt-Höchst – Niedernhausen – Limburg (Lahn)
  Frankfurt Hbf – Frankfurt-Höchst – Wiesbaden Hbf – Rüdesheim – Koblenz Hbf - Neuwied
  Frankfurt Höchst – Bad Soden
  Frankfurt Hbf – Frankfurt-Höchst– Kelkheim – Königstein
  Frankfurt Hbf – Frankfurt-Höchst – Niedernhausen – Limburg (Lahn)
  Wiesbaden Hbf – Frankfurt-Höchst – Frankfurt Hbf (tief) – Rödermark-Ober-Roden
  Niedernhausen – Frankfurt-Höchst – Frankfurt Hbf (tief) – Dietzenbach Bf

The station is served by line S 1 and S 2 of the Rhine-Main S-Bahn, operating during the day at 30-minute intervals, together providing service every 15 minutes between Frankfurt-Höchst and central Frankfurt.

It is also served by RB (Regionalbahn) 12 services on the Königstein Railway between Königstein and Frankfurt Hbf, operated by Hessische Landesbahn (HLB) every 30 minutes. The Soden line is served by RB 11 services operated by Hessische Landesbahn at hourly intervals between Frankfurt-Höchst and Bad Soden.

The station is served by the RB 10 service between Frankfurt Hbf and Neuwied every hour, operated by VIAS.

It is served by RE 20 and RB 22 services between Frankfurt Hbf and Limburg every hour, together providing a service every 30 minutes.

Use of tracks and platforms
 Platform tracks 1/2: S-Bahn lines towards central Frankfurt, Regional-Express and Regionalbahn services from Limburg to Frankfurt
 Platform tracks 3/4: S-Bahn services towards Wiesbaden/Niedernhausen (track 3)
 Platform tracks 5/6: Regionalbahn services from and to Wiesbaden/Koblenz/Neuwied
 Platform tracks 8/9: access to the cleaning facilities for Intercity-Express trains
 Platform tracks 10/11: Regional-Express and Regionalbahn services to Limburg (track 10), Soden line (track 11) (HLB)
 Platform tracks 12/13: Königstein Railway to Königstein (track 13) and Frankfurt Hauptbahnhof (track12) (HLB)

References

Railway stations in Frankfurt
Rhine-Main S-Bahn stations
Railway stations in Germany opened in 1839
Art Nouveau architecture in Germany
Art Nouveau railway stations
Buildings and structures completed in 1914